Grand Prix Challenge is a Formula One racing video game developed by Australian developer Infogrames Melbourne House and published by Infogrames for PlayStation 2. It was released in Europe on 22 November 2002, and was officially licensed by Formula One Administration. It was later released on 28 February 2003 in New Zealand and Australia, 3 March in North America and 22 May in Japan.

The game features all the drivers, cars and circuits from the 2002 Formula One season. Australian developer Torus Games also supplied the art for the Silverstone (UK), Magny-Cours (France) and Montreal (Canada) racing tracks. Cars in the game are made of around 17,000 polygons.

Game modes
There are 4 levels of AI to compete against, variable weather conditions, fuel usage, tire wear, interactive pitstops and various car setups. 
 Time Trial
 Single Grand Prix (practice/qualifying/warm-up/race) 
 Championship (competing in a 17-race season to become FIA Formula One World Champion)
 Grand Prix Challenge (series of 10 mini-championships which increase in difficulty each time)
 Multiplayer (2-player splitscreen)

Reception

The game received "generally favourable reviews" according to the review aggregation website Metacritic. In Japan, Famitsu gave it a score of 27 out of 40.

References

External links
 

2002 video games
Atari games
Infogrames games
Video games developed in Australia
PlayStation 2 games
PlayStation 2-only games
Racing video games
Formula One video games
Multiplayer and single-player video games